Watkin is an English surname formed as a diminutive of the name Watt (also Wat), a popular Middle English given name itself derived as a pet form of the name Walter.
First found in a small Welsh village in 1629.

Within the United Kingdom it is associated with being a Welsh surname.

It may refer to:

People
Arthur Watkin, English footballer
Billy Watkin,  English footballer
Cyril Watkin, English footballer
Edward Watkin, Victorian railway chairman
Edward Watkin (disambiguation)
Evan Watkin, New Zealand cricket umpire
Frank Watkin, English footballer
George Watkin, English footballer
Louise Watkin, British paralympic swimmer
Pierre Watkin, an American actor
Steve Watkin, English cricketer
Steve Watkin (footballer), Welsh footballer
Thomas Glyn Watkin, Welsh lawyer
Watkin Tench, British marine officer in Australia's First Fleet
Watkin Tudor Jones, also known as Ninja, South African rapper
Sir Watkin Williams-Wynn, 6th Baronet, Welsh politician
William Thompson Watkin (1836–1888), English archaeologist
William Ward Watkin, American architect

See also 
Watkin Baronets
 Watkins (surname)
 Atkin (disambiguation), Atkins (surname)
 Atkinson (surname)

English-language surnames
Surnames from given names